Sprig Muslin is a Regency romance novel by Georgette Heyer. The story is set in 1813.

Plot summary

Sir Gareth is a noted Corinthian and has been a confirmed bachelor ever since his betrothed died prematurely, seven years ago. He decides for practical reasons to marry an old friend, Hester, who is unfashionable and plain, not to mention "on the shelf" at the age of 29. However, he soon meets a young, runaway girl and determines to resolve her problems satisfactorily. Unfortunately, this particular runaway is possessed of an extremely lively imagination, and gets them both into a little more trouble than he had bargained for.

The piece is reminiscent of Charity Girl, also about a wiser and more experienced man helping a young girl to find her feet while avoiding becoming romantically entangled with her.

Characters
Sir Gareth Ludlow — a Corinthian who never got over the death of his fiancée Clarissa Lincombe seven years ago.	
	
Lady Hester Theale — 29, the eldest daughter of Lord Brancaster	

Lord Theale, Earl of Brancaster — Lady Hester's widowed father, profligate member of the Prince Regent's set, country seat is Brancaster Park, Chatteris
		
Lord Theale, Viscount Widmore — Lady Hester's brother	

Cliff — Lord Theale's butler	

Povey — Lady Hester's maid	
	
Amanda 'Smith' — intrepid daughter of general, 17

Captain Neil — a brigade major	

Mrs Beatrix Wetherby	Sir Gareth's sister		

Mr Warren Wetherby — Sir Gareth's brother-in-law		

The Reverend Augustus Whiteleaf — Lord Brancaster's chaplain, aspirant to Lady Hester's hand	
	
The Honourable Fabian Theale — Lord Brancaster's brother, a roué 	
	
Trotton — Sir Gareth's groom		

Mr & Mrs Sheet — proprietors of an inn at Bythorn		

Mr Joe Ninfield — a farmhand, godson of Mrs Sheet 	
	
Mr Hildebrand Ross — a dramatist and student of Cambridge, on his way to Ludlow on vacation

Mrs & Mrs Chicklaid — proprietors of the Bull Inn at Little Staughton

References

Novels by Georgette Heyer
Historical novels
1956 British novels
Fiction set in 1813
Novels set in the 1810s
Heinemann (publisher) books
Regency romance novels
British romance novels